The Development Management Institute is an educational institute in Patna, Bihar, India. It was established in 2014 with the active support of the Rural Development Department, Government of Bihar.

Development Management Institute offers a two-year post-graduate diploma in Development Management.

Its programme is accredited by the  All India Council for Technical Education.

History 
Development Management Institute was set up13 February 2014 pursuant to a desire and decision of the Government of Bihar to establish a High Performing Knowledge Institution patterned on the vision with which the Institute of Rural Management Anand (IRMA) was established in 1979. Nitish Kumar, chief minister of Bihar, in a meeting attended by core committee members, directed officials concerned to complete recruitment of faculty for the institute by March 2014, so that the academic work could begin from the coming academic session July–August 2014. The first class commenced their studies in June 2014. A 15-acre campus is being built in Bihta.

Courses offered 
Development Management Institute conducts regular two-year diploma program in development management. Its management programmes are accredited by All India Council for Technical Education. Admission to the post-graduate programme is done through Common Admission Test. Many management events, competitions, and workshops are organised by various committees throughout the year. The curriculum primarily focuses on imparting competencies necessary for participatory governance and management of resources, enterprises, institutions and interventions. The programme design consists of mutually reinforcing classroom and experiential learning interspersed at regular intervals.

Associate organisations 
Development Management Institute was set up in 2014 with the  support of the Rural Development Department, Government of Bihar and several prominent development support agencies (the Bihar Rural Livelihood Promotion Society and the Bihar State Milk Co-Operative Federation).

References

External links 
Official website

Business schools in Bihar
Universities and colleges in Patna
2014 establishments in Bihar
Educational institutions established in 2014
Education in Patna